Lankapura may refer to:
Lankapura Dandanatha, a general of the army of Parakramabahu I, who led an expeditionary force to South India
The capital city of Lanka, the island fortress of the king Ravana in Hindu Mythology
A city in Polonnaruwa District, one of the 25 districts of Sri Lanka
Lankapura Pradeshiya Sabhawa (local government), for Lankapura and suburbs (in Polonnaruwa District)
 Lankapura Divisional Secretariat